Alcuin School is an independent, non-sectarian, co-educational day school in Dallas, Texas. With Montessori and International Baccalaureate programs, it serves students from 18-months-old through the 12th grade. Alcuin is accredited by the Independent Schools Association of the Southwest, recognized by the Association Montessori Internationale, and is an IB World School.

History 

Alcuin School is one of the oldest and largest Montessori schools in North America. In 1964, Episcopal priest Albert A. Taliaferro founded the non-sectarian Montessori School of Dallas. In subsequent years the school’s name would change to St. Alcuin Montessori School and then Alcuin School. Though a handful of Montessori schools had opened in the United States in the wake of early publicity of Maria Montessori’s educational methods in the 1910s, the movement soon fizzled, and by 1920 there were virtually no Montessori schools left in the country. Alcuin’s predecessor school was opened during a second wave of enthusiasm for Montessori education in the U.S., which hit in the early 1960s, spurred by the advocacy of Nancy McCormick Rambusch, an American educator who received her Montessori training in London.

Originally occupying part of a two-story house in the Highland Park neighborhood, the Montessori School of Dallas served 68 students between the ages of two and five. After its first year, the school purchased two acres in what was then far North Dallas on Noel Road at Montford, where it was located for nearly twenty years.

Enrollment steadily increased, and in 1983 the school –now with more than 200 students and a staff of over 20– moved to the Preston Hollow neighborhood of Dallas. In 2005, Alcuin acquired adjoining property previously occupied by the Akiba Academy, giving the school a 12-acre campus.

In 2013, Alcuin School decided to open an Upper School, offering an International Baccalaureate curriculum for middle-school and high-school students. The Upper School and its IB program began to be phased in the 2014-2015 academic year. The first class graduating high school from Alcuin was the class of 2018.

The decision to open an Upper School required expansion and renovation of the campus and its facilities, which initially raised concerns among some of the school’s residential neighbors. The concerns were resolved, and in 2015, Alcuin School’s zoning request to allow expansion and renovations was approved by the Dallas City Council.

On July 31, 2020 the school opened a new 27,000 square-foot West Campus building for the Upper School, complete with 11 classrooms, creative spaces, science labs, two dining areas, a film studio and two storm shelters.

The project is Phase 1A of a three-phase, $27 million master plan intended to give Upper School students a permanent space on campus and expand the creative and academic capacity of the school’s International Baccalaureate Programme. The remaining phases will include an additional 27,000 square-feet of space for a new Performing Arts Center, more classrooms and a new administrative building.

Montessori and IB academics 

Alcuin School is distinguished by providing both Montessori and IB programs to its students. Fewer than 10 schools in the world currently offer this combination of curricula.

Though there are no regulations attached to the use of the term “Montessori” for schools in the United States, Alcuin School adheres closely to the original philosophy of the movement’s founder. Alcuin is recognized by Association Montessori Internationale, the accrediting body founded by Maria Montessori in 1929 and most closely associated with maintaining her original philosophy and methods. Though there are an estimated 6,000 Montessori schools in the United States, there are fewer than 220 recognized by the AMI, with 20 of them in Texas and five in Dallas.

Alcuin is one of three private schools in Texas offering both the IB Middle Years Programme and the IB Diploma Programme. IB programs are internationally recognized, rigorous academic curricula that according to IBO.org are designed to “develop the intellectual, personal, emotional and social skills needed to live, learn and work in a rapidly globalizing world.” Alcuin School has been recognized by Newsweek as one of the best IB schools in the USA. Alcuin students follow the IB Middle Years Program from their 6th to 10th grade levels, and the IB Diploma Programme in their 11th and 12th grade levels.

Campus facilities 

The 12-acre Alcuin Campus includes green spaces, outdoor learning areas and athletic fields, as well as facilities such as the Innovation Studio – a high-tech learning environment equipped with tools such as 3-D printers – and the Underhill Library, which holds 28,000 books as well as digital resources. Another resource is the Wyly Performing Arts Center.

Athletics and extra-curricular activities 

Beginning in 5th grade, Alcuin School teams compete in the Metro Athletic League, shifting in 7th and 8th grades to the Texas Association of Private Schools league, and on to the Texas Association of Private and Parochial Schools in grades 9 through 12. Sports include track and field, volleyball, soccer, basketball, and tennis. After School Activities programs include theatre arts, languages, chess, arts and crafts, clay animation, and quiz bowl.

References

External links 

Alcuin School website

Educational institutions established in 1964
Private K-12 schools in Dallas
Montessori schools in the United States
International Baccalaureate schools in Texas
1964 establishments in Texas